Maria Yuryevna Tolkacheva (born ) is a Russian group rhythmic gymnast. She is the 2016 Olympics Group all-around champion, a four-time (2015, 2017-2019) World Group all-around champion, the 2015 European Games Group all-around champion and three-time European Championships (2014, 2016, 2018) Group all-around gold medalist.

Career 
She started training rhythmic gymnastics at age four in Orekhovo-Zuyevo, Russian Federation. Tolkacheva became an official member of the Russian national group in the 2014 season, she was member of the Russian group that won group all-around gold at the 2014 European Championships in Baku, Azerbaijan and at the 2014 World Championships in Izmir, where they finished 4th in group all-around and won gold in 2Ribbon + 3Balls.

In 2015, Tolkacheva and the Russian group competed at the inaugural 2015 European Games, taking gold in group all-around and 5 ribbons. They ended their season by winning gold in Group all-around at the 2015 World Championships in Stuttgart, Germany, as well as gold in 6 Clubs/2 Hoops and silver in 5 Ribbons. At these Worlds, Russia finally regained the gold medal in the all-around competition, after eight years, the last time they won the group competition was at the 2007 World Championships held in Patras, Greece.

In 2016, Tolkacheva and the Russian group won group gold at the 2016 European Championships in Holon, Israel. On August 19–21, Tolkacheva was member of the golden winning Russian group (together with Anastasia Maksimova, Anastasiia Tatareva, Anastasia Bliznyuk, Vera Biryukova) that won gold at the 2016 Summer Olympics held in Rio de Janeiro, Brazil.

Detailed Olympic results

References

External links

 
 
 

1997 births
Living people
Russian rhythmic gymnasts
Olympic gymnasts of Russia
Olympic gold medalists for Russia
Olympic medalists in gymnastics
Gymnasts at the 2016 Summer Olympics
Medalists at the 2016 Summer Olympics
Gymnasts at the 2015 European Games
Gymnasts at the 2019 European Games
European Games medalists in gymnastics
European Games gold medalists for Russia
Medalists at the Rhythmic Gymnastics World Championships
Medalists at the Rhythmic Gymnastics European Championships
European Games bronze medalists for Russia
People from Zhukovsky, Moscow Oblast
Sportspeople from Moscow Oblast